Carbellino is a municipality located in the province of Zamora, Castile and León, Spain. According to the 2009 census (INE), the municipality has a population of 222 inhabitants.

(Information about Carbellino :es:Carbellino in Spanish)

References

Municipalities of the Province of Zamora